In enzymology, a 5-formyltetrahydrofolate cyclo-ligase is an enzyme that catalyzes the chemical reaction

ATP + 5-formyltetrahydrofolate (folinic acid)  ADP + phosphate + 5,10-methenyltetrahydrofolate

Thus, the two substrates of this enzyme are ATP and 5-formyltetrahydrofolate, whereas its 3 products are ADP, phosphate, and 5,10-methenyltetrahydrofolate.

This enzyme belongs to the family of ligases, specifically the cyclo-ligases, which form carbon-nitrogen bonds.  The systematic name of this enzyme class is 5-formyltetrahydrofolate cyclo-ligase (ADP-forming). Other names in common use include 5,10-methenyltetrahydrofolate synthetase (MTHFS), formyltetrahydrofolic cyclodehydrase, and 5-formyltetrahydrofolate cyclodehydrase.  This enzyme participates in one carbon pool by folate.

Structural studies

Role in pathology
Mutations of the MTHFS gene cause the disease 5,10-methenyltetrahydrofolate synthetase deficiency.

References

 

EC 6.3.3
Enzymes of known structure